The Alice is a common nickname for Alice Springs.

The Alice may also refer to:
 The Alice (film) (2004), an Australian drama film
 The Alice (train), an Australian passenger train service in the 1980s
 The Alice (TV series), a 2005 Australian drama television series

See also
 Alice (disambiguation)